Shatu Sani Garko (born 23 November 2003) is a Nigerian model and beauty queen who was crowned the 44th Miss Nigeria in 2021. Winning at the age of 18, she is notable for being the first Muslim to win the pageant.

Background 
Garko is an indigene of Kano State, Nigeria. Although raised a Muslim, she attended a Catholic secondary school where she faced bullying. As a model, Garko was advised to ditch her hijab to succeed in the industry, which she refused.

Criticism
Garko's Miss Nigeria victory was met with opposition from Hisbah, a Muslim purist group in Northern Nigeria. Hisbah criticised Garko's participation in the pageant, describing her actions as "illegal" and a bad example to young Muslim girls. In an interview with BBC Hausa, the Kano state Hisbah board chairman, Muhammad Harun Ibn-Sina, revealed Garko's parents had been invited to a meeting with the Hisbah board for questioning.

References 

Nigerian female models
People from Kano State
Miss Nigeria winners
2003 births
Living people